Gidi may refer to:

People
 Gidi Avivi (born 1961), Israeli film producer
 Gidi Damti (born 1951), Israeli football manager and player
 Gidi Gov (born 1950), Israeli singer, TV host, entertainer, and actor
 Gidi Grinstein, Israeli societal entrepreneur
 Gidi Kanyuk (born 1993), Israeli football player
 Gidi Markuszower (born 1977), Israeli–Dutch politician

Places
 Gidi, Hazaribagh, India
 Gidi Pass, Egypt
 Las Gidi, Nigeria

Other
 Gidi Culture Festival

See also
 Gidy